TAWPI was a membership association that focused on the improvement of work processes in data capture, document and remittance processing. It was originally the OCR Users Association (OCRUA) founded in 1970, which was renamed the Recognition Technology Users Association (RTUA) in 1981. In 1993, RTUA merged with DEMA (Association for Input Technology and Management) and various OCR/Scanner/Fax associations and changed its name to TAWPI. 

TAWPI facilitated the peer-to-peer exchange of actionable information, ideas and best practices on the converging technologies and processes that enable payments automation and document management. The TAWPI annual forum and expo was a highly interactive, multi-dimensional event featuring ideas, information and advice on payments automation, distributed capture, and document & forms automation. TAWPI also hosted an annual Capture Conference and an annual Healthcare Payments Automation Summit.

In 2010, TAWPI merged with the International Accounts Payable Professionals (IAPP), International Accounts Receivable Professionals (IARP), the National Association of Purchasing and Payables (NAPP) to form the Institute of Financial Operations (IFO). Based in Orlando, Fla., with affiliates in the U.S., Canada, and the UK,  

The members and leaders of TAWPI, especially Herb Schantz of HLS Associates, were responsible for much of the development and application of optical scanning.

References

External links 

 TAWPI website
 IFO website

Business organizations based in the United States